Captain of None is the fifth studio album by French multi-instrumentalist Colleen. It was released on April 6, 2015 by Thrill Jockey records. It was recorded, mixed, and produced entirely by Schott in her music studio in San Sebastián, Spain.

Critical reception
The album has received "generally favorable" reviews from critics. On Metacritic it has an approval rating of 79 out of 100 based on reviews from 12 critics.

Track listing
 Holding Horses - 5:10  
 I'm Kin - 6:05  
 This Hammer Breaks - 6:03  
 Salina Stars - 3:39  
 Lighthouse - 6:38  
 Soul Alphabet - 4:54  
 Eclipse - 4:00  
 Captain Of None - 5:57

References

Colleen (musician) albums
2015 albums
Thrill Jockey albums